A Faithful Man is a 2018 French romantic comedy-drama film directed by Louis Garrel, from a screenplay by Garrel and Jean-Claude Carrière. It stars Laetitia Casta, Lily-Rose Depp, Joseph Engel and Garrel.

The film had its world premiere at the 2018 Toronto International Film Festival on 9 September 2018. It was released in France on 26 December 2018.

Plot
Abel (Garrel) learns that his girlfriend, Marianne (Casta), is leaving him for his best friend Paul, who is the father of her child. Seven or eight years later, Paul dies and Abel and Marianne resolve to restart their relationship as she and her son Joseph (Engel) move in. Joseph claims that his father died because Marianne poisoned him. Abel is also sought after by Ève (Depp), Paul's younger sister who's been infatuated with Abel since she was 14 years old. When Ève directly tells Marianne to leave Abel or "it's war", Marianne prompts the confused Abel to sleep with Ève. Now caught in a difficult situation between two women and a young boy with an eerie fixation on murder, will Abel keep his relationship with Marianne intact?

Cast
 Louis Garrel as Abel
 Laetitia Casta as Marianne
 Lily-Rose Depp as Ève
 Joseph Engel as Joseph

Production
In February 2018, it was announced Louis Garrel would direct the film, from a screenplay he wrote with Jean-Claude Carrière, and star in the film, alongside Laetitia Casta and Lily-Rose Depp. Why Not Productions produced the film.

Release
The film had its world premiere at the 2018 Toronto International Film Festival on 9 September 2018, followed by its US premiere at the New York Film Festival. Shortly after, Kino Lorber acquired US distribution rights to the film. It was released in France on 26 December 2018. In the United States, it received a limited release on 19 July 2019.

Critical reception
The site's critical consensus reads, "A Faithful Man's lack of tonal commitment may frustrate, but the end results should still prove entertaining for viewers in the mood for a French romantic farce." On Metacritic, the film holds a rating of 67 out of 100, based on 15 critics, indicating "generally favorable reviews".

References

External links
 

2018 films
2018 romantic comedy-drama films
Films directed by Louis Garrel
Films set in Paris
Films shot in Paris
French romantic comedy-drama films
2010s French-language films
2010s French films